Cleveland Township is a township in Barton County, Kansas, USA.  As of the 2010 census, its population was 42.

Geography
According to the USGS, it contains one cemetery, Bethel.

References
 USGS Geographic Names Information System (GNIS)

External links
 City-Data.com

Townships in Barton County, Kansas
Townships in Kansas